Surjeet Singh Deol (9 August 1924 – 8 June 1984) was a Kenyan field hockey player. He competed at the 1956 Summer Olympics and the 1960 Summer Olympics. He is the father of Canadian hockey international Ranjeev Deol.

References

External links
 

1924 births
1984 deaths
Kenyan male field hockey players
Olympic field hockey players of Kenya
Field hockey players at the 1956 Summer Olympics
Field hockey players at the 1960 Summer Olympics
Sportspeople from Nairobi
Kenyan people of Indian descent
Kenyan people of Punjabi descent
Kenyan emigrants to India
Field hockey players from Punjab, India